The 2016–17 Football League was the second division of the Greek professional football system and the seventh season under the name Football League after previously being known as Beta Ethniki. Its season began on 30 October 2016 and concluded on 11 June 2017.

Teams

 1 Kalloni was expelled during the season
 2 Panthrakikos withdrew during the season

Structure
There are eighteen clubs that compete in the Football League, playing each other in a home and away series. At the end of the season, the bottom four teams are relegated to Gamma Ethniki. The top two teams gain automatic promotion for Super League. All teams in the Football League take part in the Greek Football Cup.

League table

Matches

1 The opponents of Acharnaikos awarded a 3–0 w/o win each.
2 The opponents of Panthrakikos awarded a 3–0 w/o win each.
3 Sparti did not show up to the match, so Panserraikos awarded a 3–0 w/o win.

Top scorers

References

2
Second level Greek football league seasons
Greece